Ntak Ibesit is a densely populated rural town in Akwa Ibom State of Nigeria. The town was noted for production and trade in palm oil and kernel. In recognition of its strategic importance, the Colonial administration established a river port at Ekpene Okpo, with a colonial court . The court is still in operation today. One of the distinguishing features of Ntak Ibesitt is the network of colonial roads. There is a road linking Ikot Okoro, Mbon Ebre, Ukpom and Ekparakwa- all neighbouring towns and villages. A very popular market in Ntak Ibesit is Urua Ekenyong Obom, which is centrally located to serve Ukpom Edem Inyang, Mbon Ebre, Ediene Ikot Ebom.

The road linking Ikot Afanga town and Ntak Ibesit was named after a man called Udo Anwa-the Man Leopard. He was a commander who was arrested during the Ekpe Ikpa Ukot War, of the late 1940s. The MAN LEOPARD killings were believed to be one war fought, in the southern Annang, to draw the attention of the colonial administrators to the plight of the locals in the area, who were regarded mainly as drawers of waters and hewers of wood. The struggle has engaged the attention of many authors internationally (see: G I Nwaka: The Leopard Killings of Southern Annang 1943-48, 1986).

Ntak Ibesit was  seriously affected by the Nigerian civil war, to the extent that the Ummanis and other foreign traders who settled and carried out business at Ekpene Okpo (the river port of the town) left and did not return. The footprints of the White Missionaries are very visible in Ntak Ibesit, the Qua Iboe Mission cathedral and the St John's African Church Primary School, built in 1940.

They were headquartered there as the administrative centre of the southern Annang. Ntak Ibesit shared some common boundaries with Asanga and it is made up of five town units  namely: Ikot Esikan, Ikot Okoetok, Ikot Udo Aduak, Ataha Essien and Ataha Ntak. Another town unit was proposed which was named Ikot Ama Odung. Chief Ezekiel Sunday Ibanga was the proponent of the  proposed town unit. The Akwa Ibom State Government has proposed to establish a skill acquisition centre for Ntak Ibesit to take care of youth un-employment.

References
 G I Nwaka: The Leopard Killings of Southern Annang, 1943-1948, 1986.
 David Pratten: The Man Leopard Murders: History and Society in Colonial Nigeria.Amazon Books.

Towns in Oruk Anam
Populated places in Akwa Ibom State